Barcoo may refer to:


Geography
 Shire of Barcoo, a local government area in Queensland, Australia
 Electoral district of Barcoo, Queensland, Australia
 Barcoo River, Queensland, Australia

Ships
 , a Royal Australian Navy frigate
 , a passenger ship requisitioned by the Royal Australian Navy in 1914

People
 Luq Barcoo (born 1998), American National Football League player

See also
 Scortum barcoo, a fish species also known as the Barcoo grunter
 Barcoo fever, a formerly common Australian ailment
 Aussie salute or Barcoo salute, a gesture intended to keep bush flies from a person's face
 Gheorghe Barcu (born 1934), Romanian former footballer